Ishatherium is an extinct genus of ungulate from the early Eocene of the Subathu formation in northwestern India.

It is only known from a partial upper molar and was formerly classified as a sirenian. It was placed in Anthracobunidae in 1983 but this placement was rejected in a 2014 cladistic analysis.

References 

 

Prehistoric odd-toed ungulates
Eocene odd-toed ungulates
Prehistoric placental genera
Fossils of India